Hemiarthrum setulosum is a species of chiton in the family Hanleyidae, the only member of the genus Hemiarthrum.

Hemiarthrum setulosum represent one of the five major clades of chitons that are living. Hemiarthrim setulosum has an incomplete lateral tract in the nerve ring. They are the only known species to have an incomplete one.

References

Hanleyidae
Monotypic mollusc genera